

The Nickel & Foucard NF-2 Asterix is a French two-seat monoplane built by Rudy Nickel and Joseph Foucard. Designed for amateur construction from plans, the prototype Asterix first flew in 1987.

Design and development
The Astrix is a wood and fabric, tandem two-seat, high-wing monoplane with a pivoting wing, it is powered by  Citroen Visa converted motorcar engine, similar powered engines like the Rotax 582 have also been used.

Specifications

References

Notes

Bibliography

1990s French civil utility aircraft
Homebuilt aircraft
Single-engined pusher aircraft